Auridistomidae is a family of trematodes belonging to the order Plagiorchiida.

Genera:
 Auridistomum Stafford, 1905
 Patagium Heymann, 1905

References

Plagiorchiida